Mauricio Raúl Kagel (24 December 1931 – 18 September 2008) was an Argentine-German composer.

Biography
Kagel was born in Buenos Aires, Argentina, into an Ashkenazi Jewish family that had fled from Russia in the 1920s . He studied music, history of literature, and philosophy in Buenos Aires . In 1957 he moved as a scholar to Cologne, Germany, where he lived until his death.

As teacher

From 1960–66 and 1972–76 he taught at the International Summer School at Darmstadt . He also taught from 1964–65 at the State University of New York at Buffalo as Slee Professor of music theory. At the Berlin Film and Television Academy he was a visiting lecturer. He served as director of courses for new music in Gothenburg and Cologne . He was professor for new music theatre at the Cologne Conservatory from 1974–97. Among his students were Maria de Alvear, Carola Bauckholt, Branimir Krstić, David Sawer, Juan Maria Solare, Norma Tyer, Gerald Barry, and Chao-Ming Tung.

As composer

Some of his pieces give specific theatrical instructions to the performers , such as to adopt certain facial expressions while playing, to make their stage entrances in a particular way, to physically interact with other performers, and so on. For this reason commentators at times related his work to the Theatre of the Absurd. He has been regarded by music historians as deploying a critical intelligence interrogating the position of music in society . He was also active in the fields of film and photography. In 1991 Kagel was invited by Walter Fink as the second composer featured in the annual Komponistenporträt of the Rheingau Musik Festival. In 2000 he received the Ernst von Siemens Music Prize.

Works
Staatstheater (1970) remains, probably, Kagel's best-known work. It is the piece that most clearly shows his absurdist tendency. He described it as a "ballet for non-dancers," although it is in many ways more like an opera; the devices it uses as musical instruments include chamber pots and enema equipment. As the work progresses, the piece itself, and opera and ballet in general, becomes its own subject matter.

Similar is the radio play Ein Aufnahmezustand (1969) which is about the incidents surrounding the recording of a radio play. In Con voce (With Voice), a masked trio silently mimes playing instruments. Match (1964) is a "tennis game" for cellists with a percussionist as umpire , also the subject of one of Kagel's films and perhaps the best-known of his works of instrumental theatre .

But Kagel wrote a large number of more conventional "pure" pieces too, including orchestral music, chamber music. Many of these make references to music of the past by, among others, Beethoven, Brahms, Bach and Liszt.

Kagel also made films, with one of the best known being Ludwig van (1970), a critical interrogation of the uses of Beethoven's music made during the bicentenary of that composer's birth . In it, a reproduction of Beethoven's studio is seen, as part of a fictive visit of the Beethoven House in Bonn. Everything in it is papered with sheet music of Beethoven's pieces. The soundtrack of the film is a piano playing the music as it appears in each shot. Because the music has been wrapped around curves and edges, it is somewhat distorted, but Beethovenian motifs can still be heard. In other parts, the film contains parodies of radio or TV broadcasts connected with the "Beethoven Year 1770". Kagel later turned the film into a piece of sheet music itself which could be performed in a concert without the film—the score consists of close-ups of various areas of the studio, which are to be interpreted by the performing pianist.

Stage works

 Camera obscura chromatic play for light sources with performers (1965)
 Staatstheater (1967/70)
 Mare nostrum, Scenic Play for countertenor, baritone, flute, oboe, guitar, harp, cello and percussion (1975)
 Kantrimiusik, pastorale for voices and instruments (1975)
 Music-Epic about the Devil "La trahison orale" (1983)

For orchestra

 Dos piezas for orchestra (1952)
 Heterophonie for orchestra (1959–61)
 Zehn Märsche, um den Sieg zu verfehlen (Ten marches in order to miss victory), for brass orchestra (1979)
 Les idées fixes, rondo for orchestra (1988/89)
 Opus 1.991 for orchestra (1990)
 Konzertstück (Concert piece), for timpani and orchestra (1990–92)
 Études for orchestra (I 1992, II 1995/96, III 1996)
 Fremde Töne & Widerhall (Strange sounds and echo), for orchestra (2005)

Chamber music

 String Sextet (1953–57)
 Transición II for piano, percussion, and two tapes (1958–59)
 Sonant for guitar, harp, contrabass, and skin instruments (1960)
 Improvisation ajoutée for organist and 2–3 "registrants" (1961–62)
 Match for three players (two celli and percussionist-umpire) (1964)
 Musik für Renaissance-Instrumente, for two up to twenty-two instruments (1965–66)
 String Quartets Nos. 1 and 2 (1965–67)
 Der Schall for five players performing on 54 plucked-string, percussion, and wind instruments (1968)
 Acustica for experimental sound-producers and loud-speakers (1968–70)
 Atem for a wind instrument (1969–70)
 Morceau de concours for 1 or 2 trumpets (1968–72)
 1898 for children's voices and instruments (1972–73)
 Dressur, trio for wood percussion (1977)
 Rrrrrrr...: 5 Jazzstucke for clarinet, bass clarinet, alto saxophone, violin and piano (1981–1982)
 Rrrrrrr..., six duos for two percussionists (1982)
 Pan a tutti i Papagheni, for piccolo and string quartet (1985)
 Piano Trio No. 1 (1985)
 String Quartet No. 3 (1986)
 Aus dem Nachlass, pieces for viola, cello, and contrabass (1986)
 Zwei Akte grand duo for sopranino, alto, baritone saxophones and harp (1988–89)
 Phantasiestück for flute and piano (1989)
 ..., den 24.XII.1931 mutilated news for baritone and instruments (1991)
 String Quartet No. 4 (1993)
 Schattenklänge, three pieces for bass clarinet (1995) [14']
 Art bruit for a percussionist and an assistant (1994/95)
 Piano Trio No. 2 (2001)

Vocal works

 Blue's Blue, for voice and glass trumpet, E-flat clarinet and alto saxophone, acoustic guitar and violin (1978–79)
 Fürst Igor – Strawinsky, a requiem for Igor Strawinsky for bass and instruments (1982)
 Sankt-Bach-Passion for soloists, choirs and orchestra (premiered in 1985)
 Ein Brief for mezzo soprano and orchestra (1985–86)
 Mitternachtsstük for voices and instruments on four fragments from the diary of Robert Schumann (1980–81/86)
 Schwarzes Madrigal (Black madrigal), for choir, trumpet, tuba and 2 percussionists (1998/99)
 In der Matratzengruft for tenor and ensemble (2008)

Film

 Antithese (1965) 
 Match (1966) 
 Solo (1967) 
 Duo (1968) 
 Hallelujah (1969) 
 Ludwig van (1970) 
 Tactil (1971) 
 Zwei-Mann-Orchester (1973) 
 Unter Strom (1975) 
 Kantrimiusik (1976) 
 Phonophonie (1979) 
 Blue's Blue (1981) 
 MM 51 (1983) 
 Szenario: Un chien andalou (1982) 
 Er: Television play on A Radio Fantasy (1984) 
 Dressur (1985) 
 Mitternachtsstük (1987) 
 Répertoire (1989) 
 Bestiarium (2000)

References

Further reading

External links
Mauricio Kagel website, biography
Mauricio Kagel biography and works on the UE website (publisher)
Mauricio Kagel site by Björn Heile
Kagel Biography by BBC Radio 3 programme Cut and Splice.
Mauricio Kagel at UbuWeb Film presents various Kagel films, including the full version of Ludwig Van, available for free download.
Kagel's Acustica at the Avant Garde Project has FLAC files made from a high-quality LP transcription available for free download.
Edition Peters: Mauricio Kagel October 1998.
Interview: There Will Always Be Questions Enough Mauricio Kagel in conversation with Max Nyffeler.
UbuWeb: Mauricio Kagel featuring Der Schall (1968) and ACUSTICA for experimental sound-producers and loud-speakers.
Washington Post obit by Anne Midgette.
Guardian obit by Adrian Jack.
New York Times obituary by William Grimes.

 
Interview with Mauricio Kagel, 2 November 1992

1931 births
2008 deaths
20th-century classical composers
21st-century classical composers
Jewish classical composers
Jewish Argentine musicians
Argentine classical composers
German classical composers
Deutsche Grammophon artists
Rolf Schock Prize laureates
Argentine emigrants to Germany
Argentine Jews
Argentine people of Russian-Jewish descent
People from Buenos Aires
Officers Crosses of the Order of Merit of the Federal Republic of Germany
Members of the Academy of Arts, Berlin
German male classical composers
20th-century German composers
Ernst von Siemens Music Prize winners
21st-century German composers
20th-century male musicians
21st-century male musicians